Joseph Lewis French (18581936) was a novelist, editor, poet and newspaper man. The New York Times noted in 1925 that he may be "the most industrious anthologist of his time." He is known for his popular themed collections, and published more than twenty-five books between 1918 and his death in 1936. He initiated two magazines, The New West (c. 1887) and The Wave (c. 1890). Afterward he worked for newspapers "across the country" contributing poetry and articles. He struggled financially, and during 1927 the New York Graphic, a daily tabloid, published an autobiographical article they convinced him to write, entitled "I'm StarvingYet I'm in Who's Who as the Author of 27 Famous Books."

Publications 
 The Best Ghost Stories, introduced by Arthur B. Reeve. New York: Boni & Liveright, 1919
 The Best Psychic Stories. New York: Boni & Liveright, 1920
 A Breath of Desire : XXVIII sonnets. Boston: French, 1901
 Christ in Art. Boston: L. C. Page & Company, 1906c1899
 Great Ghost Stories, selected by Joseph Lewis French, with a foreword by James H. Hyslop. New York: Dodd, Mead and Company, 1918
 Great Pirate Stories, edited by Joseph Lewis French. New York: Tudor, 1922
 Great Sea Stories. New York: Brentano's, 1921
 Masterpieces of Mystery. Garden City, New York: Doubleday, Page & Company, 1920
 Masterpieces of Mystery, Vol. 1: Ghost Stories. Garden City, N. Y.: Doubleday, Page & Company, 1922. (Volume 1 of 4.)
 Masterpieces of Mystery In Four Volumes: Detective Stories
 Masterpieces of Mystery In Four Volumes: Mystic-Humorous Stories
 Masterpieces of Mystery: Riddle Stories
 The Pioneer West; narratives of the westward march of empire, selected and edited by Joseph Lewis French. Boston: Little, Brown and Company, 1923
 Tales of Terror. Boston: Small, Maynard & Company, 1925
 Ghosts, Grim and Gentle. New York: Dodd, Mead & Company, 1926
 The Ghost Story Omnibus. New York: Dodd, Mead & Company, 1926

References

External links
 
 
 
 

1858 births
1936 deaths
20th-century American male writers
20th-century American novelists
20th-century American poets
American book editors
American male novelists
American male poets